Gymnoscelis deleta is a moth in the family Geometridae. It is found in India, Korea, Japan, Taiwan and probably in Sri Lanka according to Hampson.

Description
Body rufous, suffused and with black irrorations (sprinkles). Forewings with traces of sub-basal and antemedial waved lines angled below the costa. The medial area with an indistinct waved line found at its middle and defined by black lines, where the inner highly angled in cell. The outer oblique from costa to vein 4, where it is angled. The outer area with a pale patch from the postmedial line to apex and a less prominent patch at middle. A submarginal waved dark line found with blackish mark at costa and crossed by two black streaks below apex. Hindwings with indistinct waved subbasal, antemedial, postmedial, and submarginal lines. The postmedial double, angled at vein 6 and with ochreous beyond it, especially on inner area. A large pale spot found at middle of outer area. Ventral side fuscous with pale patches. A postmedial line angled at vein 4 of forewing and vein 6 of hindwing. A curved submarginal line present.

References

Moths described in 1891
deleta
Moths of Japan
Taxa named by George Hampson